Hadrut District was an administrative unit within the former Nagorno-Karabakh Autonomous Oblast (NKAO) of the Azerbaijan Soviet Socialist Republic.

History 
The district was formed on 8 August 1930, as the Dizak district; it was renamed Hadrut District on 17 September 1939. The administrative center of the district was the town of Hadrut.

The total area of the district was 679 km2 and it included 41 villages (1986).

Along with NKAO, the district was abolished on 26 November 1991 and was incorporated into Khojavend District of Azerbaijan.

Following the First Nagorno-Karabakh war, the former district came under the control of the self-proclaimed Republic of Artsakh and was incorporated into its Hadrut Province. However, during the 2020 Nagorno-Karabakh war, Azerbaijan recaptured the town of Hadrut during the Battle of Hadrut, followed by the whole of the district.

Demographics

References

Subdivisions of the Nagorno-Karabakh Autonomous Oblast
History of the Republic of Artsakh